The 1970 Asian Champion Club Tournament was the 3rd edition of the annual Asian club football competition hosted by Asian Football Confederation. Seven clubs from seven countries competed in the tournament: Saunders SC withdrew after the draw. The tournament was held in Tehran, Iran in April. The clubs were split in two groups and the group winners and runners-up advanced to semifinals.

The home club, Taj, became the first Iranian club to win the competition.

Venues 
All matches were played in Amjadieh Stadium, Tehran.

Group stage

Group A

Group B

Knockout stage

Semi-finals

1 The match was scratched and Hapoel advanced to the final after Homenetmen refused to play Hapoel for political reasons.

Third-place match

Final

References

External links
Asian Club Competitions 1970 at RSSSF.com

1
1970
International club association football competitions hosted by Iran